Sachaliphantes is a monotypic genus of Asian sheet weavers containing the single species, Sachaliphantes sachalinensis. It was first described by Michael I. Saaristo & A. V. Tanasevitch in 2004, and has only been found in Japan, Korea, China, and Russia.

See also
 List of Linyphiidae species (Q–Z)

References

Linyphiidae
Monotypic Araneomorphae genera
Spiders of Asia
Spiders of Russia